Sao Thong Hin is one of the six subdistricts (tambon) of Bang Yai District, in Nonthaburi Province, Thailand. Neighbouring subdistricts are (from north clockwise) Bang Rak Phatthana, Bang Rak Yai, Bang Len, Bang Muang and Bang Mae Nang. In 2020 it had a total population of 40,566 people.

Administration

Central administration
The subdistrict is subdivided into 8 administrative villages (muban).

Local administration
The area of the subdistrict is shared by two local administrative organizations.
Sao Thong Hin Subdistrict Municipality
Bang Muang Subdistrict Municipality

References

External links
Website of Sao Thong Hin Subdistrict Municipality
Website of Bang Muang Subdistrict Municipality

Tambon of Nonthaburi province
Populated places in Nonthaburi province